Germaine may refer to:

People

Given name
Germaine Arnaktauyok (born 1946), Inuk printmaker, painter, and drawer
Germaine Cousin (1579–1601), French saint
Germaine Greer (born 1939), feminist writer and academic
Germaine Koh (born 1967), Malaysian-born Canadian artist 
Germaine Lindsay (1985–2005), British-Jamaican Islamist suicide bomber
Germaine Pratt (born 1998), American football player
Germaine de Randamie (born 1984), Dutch kickboxer and mixed martial artist
Germaine Schnitzer (1888–1982), French-born American pianist
Germaine Tailleferre (1892–1983), French composer

Surname
Gary Germaine (born 1976), Scottish footballer

Places
Germaine, Aisne, France
Germaine, Marne, France

Other uses
Germaine (olive), an olive grown in Corsica
, a cargo ship which carried the name Germaine L D between 1924 and 1931

See also
Germain (disambiguation)
Germane, a chemical compound
Germanus (disambiguation)
Jermaine (disambiguation)